Roy Fraser Elliott,  (November 25, 1921 – January 26, 2005) was a Canadian lawyer, supporter of the arts, and philanthropist.

Early life and education

Elliott was born in Ottawa, Ontario, a son to Colin Fraser Elliott (at one time, the Deputy Minister of Finance of Canada) and Marjorie Sypher. His younger sister, Marjorie Elliott Sypher, served as the First Lady of Costa Rica from 1974 to 1978.

He earned a Bachelor of Commerce degree in 1943 from Queen's University, a Bachelor of Laws (LLB) degree from Osgoode Hall Law School in 1946, and a Master of Business Administration degree from the Harvard Graduate School of Business Administration in 1947. He was called to the Ontario Bar in 1946 and the Quebec Bar in 1948.

Career and other activities

He founded the law firm of Stikeman Elliott, specializing in tax and corporate law, with H. Heward Stikeman in 1952. Stikeman Elliott became and remains one of the largest and most successful law firms in Canada. Fraser convinced the former premier of Ontario, John Robarts, to join the law firm's small Toronto office instead of joining one of several major firms that were wooing him.

He was once chairman of the board, the largest shareholder, and had been a director since 1951 of CAE Industries Ltd. He also served on the boards of Canadian Imperial Bank of Commerce, Larfarge Corp., Montreal Shipping Inc. and Standard Broadcasting Corp. Ltd.

He was president of the Art Gallery of Ontario and served on the boards of directors of the Toronto Symphony Orchestra and the Canadian Opera Company. He was Chairman Emeritus of the Toronto General and Western Hospital Foundation. In 1980, he was made a Member of the Order of Canada.

In 2001, CAE donated $1,000,000 for the creation of the R. Fraser Elliott Scholarship and Laboratory Program at the École Polytechnique and the Université de Montréal. The Canadian Opera Company's R. Fraser Elliott Hall and the Toronto General Hospital's R. Fraser Elliot Wing are named in his honour.

Family
He married Elizabeth Ann (Betty-Ann) McNicoll in 1955. They had six children: Fraser; Ann; Allison; Adrian; Jordan; and Alexandra, and, later, 15 grandchildren.

Further reading
 Stikeman Elliott: The First Fifty Years, by Richard W. Pound (2002).

References

  
 
  
 
 

1921 births
2005 deaths
Lawyers in Ontario
Canadian Anglicans
Members of the Order of Canada
People from Ottawa
Queen's University at Kingston alumni
Harvard Business School alumni
Canadian expatriates in the United States